Cryptandra tomentosa, commonly known as prickly cryptandra, is a species of flowering plant in the family Rhamnaceae and is endemic to the sothern continental Australia. It is a small, straggling, erect to low-lying shrub sometimes with spiny branches, and has cylindrical leaves and loose clusters of white, bell-shaped flowers that turn pink to red as they age.

Description
The edges of the leaves are rolled under, usually concealing most of the lower surface. Flowering occurs from May to October.

Taxonomy
Cryptandra tomentosa was formally described in 1838 by botanist John Lindley in Thomas Livingstone Mitchell's Three Expeditions into the interior of Eastern Australia. The specific epithet (tomentosa ) means "tomentose".

Distribution and habitat
Prickly cryptandra grows in heath and woodland west of Port Phillip Bay in Victoria and in south-eastern South Australia, including on Kangaroo Island.

References

tomentosa
Rosales of Australia
Flora of South Australia
Flora of Victoria (Australia)
Plants described in 1838
Taxa named by John Lindley